Pavelka (feminine Pavelková) is a Czech surname. Notable people include:
 Annie Sadilek Pavelka, Czech-American woman
 David Pavelka, Czech footballer
 Irena Pavelková, Czech slalom canoeist
 Jake Pavelka, American pilot
 Jessie Pavelka, American fitness trainer
 Karol Pavelka, Slovak footballer
 Roman Pavelka, Czech footballer
 Tomáš Pavelka, Czech ice hockey player
 Jan Pavelka, Czech photographer
 Zuzana Pavelková, Czech badminton player
 Adam Pavelka, Czech director and film maker

See also 
 Pavelka Farmstead, a farmstead in Nebraska

Czech-language surnames